Not Without My Daughter is a 1991 American drama film based on the book of the same name, depicting the escape of American citizen Betty Mahmoody and her daughter from her abusive husband in Iran. In 1990, the film was shot in the United States, Turkey and Israel, and the main characters Betty Mahmoody and Sayyed Bozorg "Moody" Mahmoody are played by Sally Field and Alfred Molina, respectively. Sheila Rosenthal and Roshan Seth star as Mahtob Mahmoody and Houssein the smuggler, respectively.

Plot
In 1984, an Iranian physician, Sayyed Bozorg "Moody" Mahmoody lives in the United States with his American wife Betty and their daughter Mahtob. Due to his background, he is often mocked and ridiculed by American physicians at the hospital where he works. Moody claims that his Iranian family wants to meet Betty and Mahtob and asks them to come with him for a two-week visit.

Despite her deep fears about visiting Iran, particularly due to the Iranian Hostage Crisis of several years earlier, Betty reluctantly agrees after her husband promises they will safely return to America. Upon their arrival, Mahtob is embraced, while Betty's unfamiliarity with the family's Islamic lifestyle inadvertently offends some members of Moody's family. The night before their flight back to the United States, Moody's brother Mammal tells Moody and Betty that in order for them to go back home, their passports would have to have been taken to the airport for approval three days prior. Betty questions this, but Moody brushes this off, suggesting that they will take a later flight.

After Betty insists that they go to the airport anyway, Moody reveals that he never intended for them to return, and that they will remain in Iran permanently. When Betty protests, Moody becomes enraged and strikes her. Betty tries to earn sympathy from Moody's family, but is scorned by them. Iran's war with Iraq continues, with the family having to shelter in place during an Iraqi missile attack; Moody blames these difficulties on American support for Iraq.

Moody becomes more hostile and abusive to his wife and daughter, preventing Betty from leaving the house or even using the telephone. One day Betty answers a phone call from her mother and reveals she is trapped in Iran. Her mother tells her to seek help from the American Interests Section of the Swiss Embassy. Betty sneaks out of the house and visits the embassy, but is told that under Iran's nationality law, she acquired Iranian citizenship upon her marriage to Moody and thus is not entitled to consular protection. Because Iran is an Islamic republic governed by sharia law, Betty cannot leave the country or make decisions concerning her daughter without her husband's permission. Moody, alarmed by Betty's absence from the house, threatens to kill her if she tries anything again.

For 18 months Betty conforms to her husband's wishes in order to gain Moody's trust. Watched by Moody's sister, Betty convinces him that they should move out of her home and into Mammal's home. By chance, during a trip to the marketplace, she meets a sympathetic storekeeper who allows her to use his telephone and overhears her conversations with the Swiss Embassy. He puts her in contact with a pair of humanitarian Iranians, Hossein and his sister, who offer to help Betty and Mahtob return to the United States. Betty accepts Hossein's assistance, especially after he warns her that Mahtob, when she reaches nine years old, could be at risk of being forced into marriage and or be drafted as a child soldier. Mahtob does not adjust to her new Iranian school and has to be accompanied to school by Betty. The women at the school tell Betty that they sympathize with her, and though they will not allow her to use the telephone, they allow her to bring Mahtob to school hours after she would normally arrive. Betty uses this time to meet with Hossein, and they discuss an escape route. When she and Mahtob arrive at school, Moody is there waiting for them and attacks Betty. She leaves with Moody, but flees when he is distracted. She finds a telephone booth and calls a woman from the Swiss embassy whom she had spoken with previously. They return to the school, but the women from the school forbid her from taking Mahtob. With no other options, Betty and Mahtob return home with Moody.

Betty learns that her father is seriously ill. Moody tells Betty he will allow her to return to see her dying father, but will not let Mahtob go with her. He tells Betty while she is in the United States, she is to liquidate their assets and return to Iran. Hossein warns Betty that if she visits her father, she may never see Mahtob again. Betty decides to wait to return to the United States with Mahtob. Moody unknowingly foils her plans by having her booked on a flight several days early, thanks to his relatives' contacts in the airport.

Moody is called to the clinic for an emergency. On the pretense of going to buy presents for her father, Betty takes Mahtob and they contact Hossein, who supplies Betty and Mahtob with fake identity documents, and they make their way past checkpoint with Iranian smugglers.

Betty and Mahtob are dropped off in a street in Ankara, where they see the flag of the American Embassy in the distance. Betty and Mahtob make it back home to the United States. Betty becomes a successful author and dedicates herself to helping those in need.

Cast
 Sally Field as Betty Mahmoody
 Alfred Molina as Sayyed Bozorg "Moody" Mahmoody
 Sheila Rosenthal as Mahtob Mahmoody
 Roshan Seth as Houssein the Smuggler
 Sarah Badel as Nicole (Swiss diplomat)
 Mony Rey as Ameh Bozorg
 Georges Corraface as Mohsen

Production
The movie was based on a book with the same title, written by Betty Mahmoody and William Hoffer and based on Betty's version of events. The screenplay was written by David W. Rintels. The film was directed by Brian Gilbert and filmed in Israel, at GG Studios in Neve Ilan and Atlanta during the summer of 1990.

A further book was released in 2015, My Name is Mahtob written by Mahtob Mahmoody with the tagline "Not without my Daughter continues".

Release and reception

Box office
The movie debuted poorly and grossed less than $15 million in ticket sales in the United States and Canada. The movie plummeted in its second week. Internationally, it grossed $28 million for a worldwide total of $43 million.

Critical response
As of December 2022, the film holds an approval rating of 53% rating on Rotten Tomatoes, based on 17 reviews. 

Roger Ebert of the Chicago Sun-Times wrote: "Here is a perplexing and frustrating film, which works with great skill to involve our emotions, while at the same time making moral and racial assertions that are deeply troubling." He stated that it "does not play fair with its Muslim characters. If a movie of such a vitriolic and spiteful nature were to be made in America about any other ethnic group, it would be denounced as racist and prejudiced. Yet I recommend that the film be seen, for two reasons. One reason is because of the undeniable dramatic strength of its structure and performances; it is impossible not to identify with this mother and her daughter, and Field is very effective as a brave, resourceful woman who is determined to free herself and her daughter from involuntary captivity. The second reason is harder to explain. I think the movie should be seen because it is an invitation to thought."

While Iranians are not shown in a completely negative light, as the film depicts generous and brave Iranians who contact Betty Mahmoody and arrange for the escape of her and her daughter, these "good" Iranians are high-born opponents of the Islamic Republic regime, shown listening to European classical music. In 2016, Gazelle Emami of Vulture, reflecting on the 25 years since the film's release, concluded that Not Without My Daughter had become known for making American women more apprehensive towards dating or marrying Iranian men.

The score by Jerry Goldsmith was also not well received.  Jay Boyar of the Orlando Sentinel called it "TV-movie manipulative", while Jason Ankeny of AllMusic wrote, "Jerry Goldsmith's score does little to refute its opponents' charges of racism."

Awards and nominations

Sheila Rosenthal won the Young Artist Award for Best Actress.

Sally Field was nominated for the Golden Raspberry Award for Worst Actress of 1991, where she lost to Sean Young for A Kiss Before Dying.

Aftermath

Alfred Molina confirmed in an interview with Time Out that he was punched by a man who apparently hated his brutal portrayal of Dr. Mahmoody in the film.

The 2002 documentary Without My Daughter attempts to contradict Betty Mahmoody’s book and the film.

See also
 Not Without My Anus
 1991 in film
 Iran-United States relations
 Escape from Taliban a 2003 Indian film
 Un burka por amor, a 2009 Spanish film about a woman trapped in Afghanistan after she followed her husband to his native country.

References

External links

 
 
 
 A criticism of Not Without My Daughter

1991 films
1991 drama films
1991 independent films
American drama films
American independent films
Drama films based on actual events
Films scored by Jerry Goldsmith
Films about domestic violence
Films based on non-fiction books
Films set in Michigan
Films set in Tehran
Films set in 1984
Films set in 1985
Films set in 1986
Films shot in Atlanta
Films shot in Israel
Metro-Goldwyn-Mayer films
Films about mother–daughter relationships
Films directed by Brian Gilbert
1990s American films